26 Ursae Majoris is a single star in the northern circumpolar constellation of Ursa Major, located 262 light years away from the Sun. It is visible to the naked eye as a faint, white-hued star with an apparent visual magnitude of 4.47. The object is moving further from the Earth with a heliocentric radial velocity of +22 km/s.

This is an A-type main-sequence star with a stellar classification of A0 Vn, where the 'n' indicates "nebulous" lines in the spectrum due to rapid rotation. It has a high rate of spin with a projected rotational velocity of 165 km/s, which is giving it an oblate shape with an equatorial bulge that is 8% larger than the polar radius. The star is 147 million years old with just over double the mass of the Sun and twice the Sun's radius. It is radiating 99 times the Sun's luminosity from its photosphere at an effective temperature of 9,757 K.

References

A-type main-sequence stars
Ursa Major (constellation)
Durchmusterung objects
Ursae Majoris, 26
082621
047006
3799